Tair Carn Uchaf (Welsh for "Upper Three Cairns") is a hill in the Brecon Beacons National Park (Parc Cenedlaethol Bannau Brycheiniog) in the county of Carmarthenshire, Wales.

The main ridge leads southwest towards the subsidiary top of Tair Carn Isaf ("Lower Three Cairns"), which hosts further cairns.

Geology and drainage

To the south is the Amman Valley into which flow the streams of Nant Pedol and Nant-y-ffin or Berach whilst the Nant Gwythwch drains westwards into the River Loughor. Rainwater falling on the hill's northern slopes is likely to spend part of its journey underground on account of the band of Carboniferous Limestone which sweeps across this area from east to west. Northward drainage is ultimately into the River Loughor and Afon Cennen.

The summit plateau is formed from blocks of the Twrch Sandstone (formerly the 'Basal Grit') of the Marros Group (former 'Millstone Grit Series') deposited during the Carboniferous period.  Whilst the general dip of the rock strata is to the south, there are areas which have foundered due to the presence of the soluble limestone not far beneath the surface.

Access
The hill is open country so walkers can roam across it at will.  There are public footpaths along its southern margin and a long bridleway crosses the moors to the east of the hill.  two minor roads cross its western flanks.  The Beacons Way route from Llangadog to Abergavenny runs along the northern flanks of Tair Carn Uchaf.

External links
 images of Tair Carn Uchaf & surrounding area on the Geograph website

References

Mountains and hills of Carmarthenshire
Black Mountain (hill)